In the 2014–15 season of the Martinique Championnat National, the top league of professional football in Martinique, the Golden Lion FC team from Saint-Joseph won the championship for the first time.

Table 

  1.Golden Lion FC (Saint-Joseph)              26  22  2  2  82-16  94  Champions
  2.Club Franciscain (Le François)             26  18  5  3  68-24  85
  3.Club Colonial (Fort-de-France)             26  18  3  5  54-18  82
  4.Aiglon (Lamentin)                          26  13  6  7  39-25  71
  5.Golden Star (Fort-de-France)               26  11  7  8  50-27  66
  6.RC Rivière-Pilote                          26  11  7  8  39-23  66 
  7.CS Case-Pilote                             26  10  6 10  38-46  62
  8.Essor-Préchotain (Prêcheur)                26  11  3 12  46-33  62 
  9.Emulation (Schoelcher)                     26   8  9  9  33-28  59
 10.Samaritaine (Sainte-Marie)                 26   9  7 10  55-38  57 
 11.US Marinoise (Marin)                       26   5  9 12  21-31  50
 12.US Robert                                  26   5  8 13  30-51  49  Relegated
 13.Réal de Tartane                            26   4  2 20  27-87  40  Relegated
 14.CS Bélimois (Lamentin)                     26   0  0 26  14-149 26  Relegated

Source:

References 

2014 in Martinique
Martinique
2015 in Martinique